Children's street culture refers to the cumulative culture created by young children. Collectively, this body of knowledge is passed down from one generation of urban children to the next, and can also be passed between different groups of children (e.g. in the form of crazes, but also in intergenerational mixing). It is most common in children between the ages of seven and twelve. It is strongest in urban working-class industrial districts where children are traditionally free to "play outside" in the streets for long periods without supervision.

Difference from mass media culture
Children's street culture is invented and largely sustained by children themselves, although it may come to incorporate fragments of media culture and toys in its activities. It is not to be confused with the commercial media-culture produced for children (e.g., comics, television, mass-produced toys, and clothing), although it may overlap.

Location and play materials

Young children's street culture usually takes place on quiet backstreets and sidewalks, and along routes that venture out into local parks, playgrounds, scrub and wasteland, and to local shops. It can often incorporate many found and scavenged materials such as old car seats, tires, planks, bricks, etc. Sometimes found materials will be combined to create objects (e.g. making guys for Guy Fawkes Night).

Play will often incorporate crazes (sometimes incorporating seasonal elements that are freely collected, such as conkers, snowballs, sycamore seeds). It also imposes imaginative status on certain sections of the urban realm (local buildings, street objects, road layouts, etc.).

In summer, children may use scavenged materials to create a temporary and semi-hidden "den" or "hideout" or "HQ" in a marginal area near their homes, which serves as an informal meeting and relaxation place. An urban area that looks faceless or neglected to an adult may have deep "spirit of place" meanings in children's street culture.

History and research
Although it varies from place to place, research shows that it appears to share many commonalities across many cultures. It is a traditional phenomenon that has been closely investigated and documented in the western world during the 20th century by anthropologists and folklorists such as Iona Opie; street photographers such as Roger Mayne, Helen Levitt, David Trainer, Humphrey Spender and Robert Doisneau; urbanists such as Colin Ward and Robin Moore, as well as being described in countless novels of childhood. The research of Robin Moore stresses children's need for 'marginal' unsupervised areas 'within running distance' of homes (scrubby bushes and hedges, disused buildings). There are now two academic journals devoted to this area, the Journal of Children's Geographies and Play & Folklore.

It has occasionally been central to feature films, such as the Our Gang ("Little Rascals") series, Ealing's Hue and Cry (1947) and some Children's Film Foundation films such as Go Kart, Go! and Soap Box Derby.

Since the advent of distractions such as video games, Internet, and television, concerns have been expressed about the vitality or survival of children's street culture. The effects of the automobile on society have also been blamed for the decline in children's street culture, due to the safety concerns of children playing outside; between 1922 and 1933, over 12,000 children in England and Wales were killed in accidents involving motor vehicles.

Children's urban legends

Many informal groups of small children will develop some level of superstitious beliefs about their local area. For instance, they may believe that there are certain places that are "unlucky" to step on (e.g.: certain large cracks in a sidewalk) or touch (e.g.: gateposts of a certain color) or pass beyond (such as the end of the sidewalk, beyond which is another dimension inhabited by the bogeyman), or that an old woman is a "witch", or that an abandoned house is "haunted". But in some extreme circumstances, a consistent myth may emerge among young children, and across a large area. One example dates from 1997; the Miami New Times published Lynda Edwards' report "Myths Over Miami", which describes a huge consistent mythology spreading among young homeless children in the American South. The story has been picked up and reprinted many times on internet blogs and websites. There is no known verification or confirmation that the mythology she describes actually exists, but these "secret stories" are clearly based on known elements of street culture, such as labeling certain places "haunted" or recycling legends of dangerous spirits such as Bloody Mary. The article was the basis for Mercedes Lackey's novel Mad Maudlin, co-written with Rosemary Edghill.

See also

References

Works cited
 Ervin Beck. "Children's Guy Fawkes Customs in Sheffield", Folklore, 95 (1984), 191-203. 
 David Sobel. Children's Special Places: Exploring the Role of Forts, Dens, and Bush Houses in Middle Childhood (2001).

Further reading

Non-fiction
 Simon Bronner. American Children's Folklore (1988).
 Robin C. Moore. Childhood's Domain: Play and Place (1986). (In-depth advanced study of three small areas of England, with maps and photos).
 Iona Opie. The People in the Playground (1993) (In-depth study of children's playground lore and life).
 Iona Opie. The Lore and Language of Schoolchildren (1959). 
 Steve Roud, The Lore of the Playground, Random House (2010).
 Robert Paul Smith. Where Did You Go? Out. What Did You Do? Nothing. (1957) (Memoir focusing on children's pastimes, New York, 1920s)
 David Sobel. Mapmaking with Children: Sense of Place Education for the Elementary Years (1998).
 Leea Virtanen. Children's Lore (1978). (English-translation of a 30,000-sample study from Finland).
 Colin Ward (with photos by Ann Golzen). The Child in the City (1977). (Groundbreaking key book, with a focus on the British experience).

The 1911 Encyclopædia Britannica entry for "Children's games" recommends: "the following works: A. B. Gomme's Traditional Games of Great Britain (2 vols., Nutt, 1894-1898); Gomme's Children's Singing Games (Nutt, 1904); ... Newell's Games of American Children (Harper Bros., New York, 1884)."

Photography books
 Roger Mayne. Street Photographs of Roger Mayne (1996, Victoria and Albert Museum).
 Robert Doisneau. Les Enfants, Les Gosses (1992).
 Helen Levitt. In The Street: chalk drawings and messages, New York City 1938-1948. (1987) — (Chalkings and children making them)
 Eddie Elliott (Curator). Knock Down Ginger: Seventy Years of Street Kids (Exhibition, Photographers' Gallery, London; July 2001).
 Les Enfants (Editions de La Martinière, France, 2001) (Anthology of French street photography of children; by Ronis, Riboud, Doisneau, Cartier Bresson, and others).
 R.S. Johnson & J.T. Oman. Street Children (1964). Hodder & Stoughton, London. (Photography & poetic text on facing pages, re: young British children's street play).

Television documentaries
 Ian Duncan. (Dir.) Picture This: Playing Out (BBC Two 1992) 
 Ian Duncan. (Dir.) The Secret World of Children (BBC 1993)
The Singing Street (1951).
 Dusty Bluebells (BBC Northern Ireland, early 1970s), and the follow-up film showing how the street's child-friendly nature had been destroyed by cars, This Is Not a Car Park (1993).
 Where do the Children Play? (NBC and University of Michigan, 2008)

 
Cultural geography